Ambulyx japonica is a species of moth of the family Sphingidae first described by Walter Rothschild in 1894. It is known from eastern China, Korea, Japan and Taiwan.

Description 
The wingspan is 81–90 mm. There is a broad subbasal band on the forewing upperside. Males are paler than females and less strongly marked.

Biology 
The larvae have been recorded feeding on Aceraceae species in China. In Japan, larvae have been recorded on Acer and Carpinus japonica. Furthermore, larvae have been reared on Carpinus laxiflora and Carpinus tschonoskii.

Subspecies
Ambulyx japonica japonica (Japan)
Ambulyx japonica angustifasciata (Okano, 1959) (Taiwan)
Ambulyx japonica koreana Inoue, 1993 (Korea and eastern China)

References

Ambulyx
Moths described in 1894
Moths of Asia